The Homestead Farm at Oak Ridge is a historic house and grounds located in Oak Ridge Park in the township of Clark in Union County, New Jersey and extending into the township of Edison in Middlesex County. It was listed on the National Register of Historic Places on October 25, 1995, for its significance in architecture, exploration/settlement, law, military history, and politics/government. In addition to the building, the listing includes three contributing sites and one contributing object.

History and description
The oldest part of the house was built . The site was formerly known as Ash Swamp and played a pivotal role in the Battle of Short Hills during in the American Revolutionary War.

The home is associated with Judge Hugh Hartshorne Bowne. The Squire Hartshorne House and the Robinson Plantation House are other homes from the 18th century located in Clark. In May 2009, the Union County Board of Chosen Freeholders announced its support of preservation of the building site.

See also
List of the oldest buildings in New Jersey
National Register of Historic Places listings in Middlesex County, New Jersey
National Register of Historic Places listings in Union County, New Jersey
Nathaniel Drake House

References

External links
 
  Battle of the Short Hills Monument
The Battle of Shorts Hills at gardenstatelegacy.com

Clark, New Jersey
Houses on the National Register of Historic Places in New Jersey
Houses in Union County, New Jersey
Houses in Middlesex County, New Jersey
Edison, New Jersey
National Register of Historic Places in Middlesex County, New Jersey
National Register of Historic Places in Union County, New Jersey
New Jersey Register of Historic Places